The Terrier Orion sounding rocket is a combination of the Terrier booster rocket with the Orion rocket used as a second stage. This spin stabilized configuration is most often used by the Goddard Space Flight Center, who operate out of the Wallops Flight Facility for sounding rocket operations.

Technical details 
The Terrier Orion system is designed to be rail launched, and can be supported at most fixed and mobile launch sites. The Terrier Mk 12 Mod 1 or Mk 70 rocket used for the first stage uses an  diameter motor along with  cruciform configured tail fins.

The fins are normally configured so that the rocket will have a stabilizing spin rate of approximately four cycles per second.

See also 
 Terrier Oriole
 Terrier Malemute

References

External links 

Sounding rockets of the United States